Tony Frost (born 17 November 1975) is an English former professional cricketer. He played as a right-handed batsman and wicket-keeper. Born in Stoke-on-Trent, Frost played for Warwickshire County Cricket Club, scoring over 4,500 runs in first-class cricket in a career which lasted from 1997 to 2009.

He played through most of season 2005, after Keith Piper's ban left Warwickshire without a regular wicket-keeper. After Tim Ambrose joined Warwickshire in 2006 Frost played very little County Championship cricket, although he played more often in one-day competitions. Frost retired as a professional at the end of the 2006 season.

Following Ambrose's call-up to play for England, Frost re-signed for Warwickshire for the 2008 season as cover. He ended the season having scored 1003 runs in 13 Championship games, averaging 83.58 runs per innings and scoring a career best of 242 not out. He came top of the county batting averages for the season and was awarded a Benefit Year for 2009.

References

External links

1975 births
Living people
Cricketers from Stoke-on-Trent
English cricketers
Warwickshire cricketers
Wicket-keepers